Peter Roozendaal (born 14 February 1962) is a former Australian rules footballer who played in Tasmania between the late 1970s and mid-1990s. He was inducted into the Tasmanian Football Hall of Fame in 2012. Roozendaal played for Scottsdale in the Northern Tasmanian Football Association (NTFA).

References

Scottsdale Football Club players
Australian rules footballers from Tasmania
Tasmanian Football Hall of Fame inductees
Living people
1962 births